The Barbaros-class frigates are among the most modern frigates in the Turkish Navy. They were designed in Germany and are part of the MEKO group of modular warships, in this case the MEKO 200 design. Two ships were built in Germany and two in Turkey with German assistance. They are larger than the previous s and are also faster due to using CODOG machinery rather than pure diesels.

The first two vessels (F 244 and F 245) are defined as the Barbaros class (MEKO 200 TN Track II-A) while the last two vessels (F 246 and F 247) are defined as the Salih Reis class (MEKO 200 TN Track II-B) by the Turkish Navy. 

Salih Reis subclass ships are built with 8-cell Mk. 41 VLS and longer than Barbaros class vessels to accommodate 16-cell Mk. 41 VLS upgrade in the future while Barbaros-class vessels built with  Mk.29 Sea Sparrow launchers that planned to be replaced by 8-cell Mk. 41 VLS.

Modernization projects
Barbaros-class vessels (F 244, F 245) have received an 8-cell Mk41 vertical launcher system (VLS) module, which replaced the obsolete Mk.29 Sea Sparrow launcher, while Salihreis-class vessels (F 246, F 247) have received a second 8-cell Mk 41 VLS module which brings the total number of cells to 16. Additionally the old AWS-9 3D air search radars in all 4 vessels has been replaced by modern Thales SMART-S Mk2 3D radars.

On 3 April 2018 a contract was signed between ASELSAN–HAVELSAN Joint Venture and the secretariat for Defense Industry (SSM) regarding the Barbaros Class Frigate mid-life upgrade project. Project includes a heavy upgrade which including new weapons systems, a new combat management system, new radars and sensors, replacing current mast with an integrated mast and various upgrades. All 4 ships are included in this project. Expected finish year for project is 2025.

The mid-life modernization program projects to double the number of anti-ship missiles that vessel is equipped with while also replacing it by locally designed and produced Atmaca anti-ship missiles, substitution of the Oerlikon Sea Zenith CIWS systems with 1 Phalanx and 1 Aselsan Gokdeniz CIWS, change the existing TACTICOS combat management system with Havelsan "B-SYS Combat Management System" and adopt a 127mm main gun to the frigates. Finally against asymmetric threats that the vessels may face 2x2 L/UMTAS launchers are planned to be integrated to the frigates.

Ships of the class

References

External links

 The First Upgraded MEKO 200 Frigate Of Turkish Navy
 BARBAROS CLASS ( MEKO 200 Track II) (Turkey) 

Frigate classes
 
Frigates of Turkey